Rhodope may refer to:
 Rhodope (mythology), a figure of Greek mythology
 Rhodope Mountains, in Bulgaria and Greece
 Rhodope (regional unit), of Greece
 Rhodope (province), a Roman and Byzantine province
 166 Rhodope, an asteroid
 Rhodope (genus), a genus of the family Rhodopidae, order Rhodopemorpha, class Gastropoda
 Mylothris rhodope, a dotted border butterfly of tropical Africa commonly known as the Rhodope